Ralph Ergham (or Erghum; died 1400) was the English bishop of Salisbury from 1375 to 1388, and then bishop of Bath and Wells from 1388 to 1400.

Ergham was Chancellor of John of Gaunt, Duke of Lancaster from 1373 to 1377. On 12 October 1375 he was selected to be Bishop of Salisbury, and was consecrated on 9 December. On 3 April 1388 he was transferred to the see of Bath and Wells. Ergham was a member of King Richard II's first council, representing John of Gaunt's interests. He died on 10 April 1400.

The executors of his will are named as: Agnes Rabbas, his sister; Thomas Tery, canon of Wells and John Podemour.

Citations

References
 Hospitals of St Mary Magdalen, Preston
 
 McKisack, May The Fourteenth Century

Bishops of Salisbury
Bishops of Bath and Wells
14th-century English Roman Catholic bishops
1400 deaths
Year of birth unknown
Chancellors of the Duchy of Lancaster